Octarrhena pusilla, commonly known as the wispy grub orchid, is an epiphytic or lithophytic plant in the orchid family. It has thin roots, usually only a single stem, between three and six fleshy, cylindrical leaves and up to twenty small, white to cream-coloured flowers. This orchid is endemic to tropical North Queensland, Australia.

Description
Octarrhena pusilla is an epiphytic or lithophytic herb usually with a single stem with thin roots. Flowering occurs between September and November.

Taxonomy and naming
The wispy grub orchid was first formally described in 1889 by Frederick Manson Bailey who gave it the name Oberonia pusilla and published the description in Report of the government scientific expedition to Bellenden-Ker Range: upon the flora and fauna of that part of the Colony. In 1992 Mark Clements and David Jones changed the name to Octarrhena pusilla. The specific epithet (pusilla) is a Latin word meaning "very small", "little" or "petty".

Distribution and habitat
The wispy grub orchid grows on mossy trees and rocks in rainforest between the Cedar Bay and Paluma Range National Parks in Queensland.

References

pusilla
Endemic orchids of Australia
Plants described in 1889
Orchids of Queensland